Spoiled Girl is the 12th studio album by American singer-songwriter Carly Simon, released by Epic Records, in June 1985.

Recorded with a variety of producers in New York, this was Simon's only album for Epic. It was commercially unsuccessful when originally released, peaking at No. 88 on the U.S. Billboard 200 album chart, but has gone on to become a cult favorite within Simon's back catalogue. The album produced two singles: "Tired of Being Blonde" and "My New Boyfriend", with the former making the Billboard Hot 100 at No. 70.

Reception

In a mixed review of the album, Rolling Stone wrote "Spoiled Girl is Simon's most listenable album in years. Thanks to production by Arthur Baker, Paul Samwell-Smith and Don Was, there’s enough verve and contemporaneity to the basic tracks so that Simon’s laconic phrasing seems newly energized, while the tracks produced by Phil Ramone and Andy Goldmark manage to convincingly update Simon's old approach. But such studio gloss is no compensation for an album that’s so utterly inconsequential. In the end, as with any other spoiled girl, you just wish she'd be quiet." 

The New York Times was much more positive, writing "Carly Simon's first album in two years is a spicy, lighthearted romp of a record in which the 40-year-old singer-songwriter imaginatively comes to terms with the frivolous spirit of mid-80's pop. Nine producers, including the electronic wizard Arthur Baker, worked on the album, whose songs range in style from the kind of catchy folk-pop that has long been Miss Simon's stock in trade to ultracontemporary dance-oriented tunes with electronically tricked-up textures." They also singled out the track "Black Honeymoon" as "the album's darkest and most musically haunting song, a chilling vignette about sexual jealousy elegantly produced in a style that suggests a folkish variant of Steely Dan's pop-jazz by way of Tina Turner's Private Dancer. It is one of the finest cuts Miss Simon has ever recorded."

Release history
Spoiled Girl was released by Epic Records on vinyl, cassette tape, and compact disc in 1985. Both the cassette and CD versions included the bonus track "Black Honeymoon" (originally the B-side of the "Tired Of Being Blonde" single). A second CD release came in the late 1990s under the Sony Music Special Products label, which also included "Black Honeymoon". In July 2012, Hot Shot Records re-released the album as a deluxe edition with four bonus tracks: "Black Honeymoon", the 7" single version of "Tired Of Being Blonde", and two remixes of the track "My New Boyfriend" which were originally included on the 12" version of the single.

Track listing
Credits adapted from the album's liner notes.

Notes 
 The song "Black Honeymoon" was the B-side for the single "Tired of Being Blonde" and appears only on the cassette and CD versions of the album, but not on the vinyl LP.

Personnel

Musicians

Production

Charts
Album – Billboard (United States)

Album – International

Singles – Billboard (United States)

References

External links
Carly Simon's Official Website

1985 albums
Carly Simon albums
Albums produced by Phil Ramone
Albums produced by Don Was
Albums produced by Paul Samwell-Smith
Albums produced by Russ Kunkel
Albums produced by Arthur Baker (musician)
Epic Records albums
Albums recorded at Electric Lady Studios
Albums recorded at MSR Studios